37 Camelopardalis is a solitary star in the northern circumpolar constellation Camelopardalis. It has an apparent magnitude of 5.36, allowing it to be seen with the naked eye under ideal conditions. Located 444 light years away, the star is receding with a heliocentric radial velocity of 30.92 .

37 Camelopardalis has a stellar classification of G8 III, indicating that the object is an ageing yellow giant.

References

Camelopardalis (constellation)
Camelopardalis, 37
G-type giants
Durchmusterung objects
041597
2152
029246